East Dean  may refer to the following places in England:

East Dean, East Sussex
East Dean, Gloucestershire
East Dean, Hampshire
East Dean, West Sussex